Vaidehi may refer to:

Vaidehi, another name for the goddess Sita 
Vaidehi (2006 TV series), also known as Vaidehi – Ek Aur Agni Pareeksha, a 2006 Indian Hindi-language television series
Vaidehi (2013 TV series), a 2013 Indian Tamil-language family drama television series
Vaidehi (film), a 2009 Tamil romance film 
Vaidehi (Kannada writer) (born 1945), Kannada language writer
Vaidehi, stagename of actress Delna Davis in Tamil films
Queen Vaidehi, mother of king Ajatashatru